This is a list of Danish steamships, entering service in Denmark from 1819 onwards. The list is based on the three volumes of Danish steamship history by Holger Munchaus Petersen, Danske dampskibe indtil 1870, following the chronology of his list in volume III. As the duchies of Schleswig and Duchy of Holstein were part of the Danish realm until 1864, the list also includes steamships serving there.

Ships 
The year shown in the list is the year of entering service in Denmark. Some ships served in other countries before that, primarily the United Kingdom.

References 

Lists of ships of Denmark
 List